Carlos Alberto "Lole" Reutemann (12 April 1942 – 7 July 2021) was an Argentine racing driver who raced in Formula One from  to , and later became a politician in his native province of Santa Fe, for the Justicialist Party, and governor of Santa Fe in Argentina.

As a racing driver, Reutemann was among Formula One's leading protagonists between 1972 and 1982. He scored 12 Grand Prix wins and six pole positions. In 1981 while driving for Williams he finished second in the World Drivers' Championship by one point, having been overtaken in the last race of the season. To date, he was the last Argentine driver to win a Grand Prix.

In terms of race wins, his final Ferrari season in 1978 was his most successful with four wins, but he fell short to the consistency of the Lotus team with Mario Andretti and Ronnie Peterson and was not in championship contention to the final race. He finished third, just behind Peterson, who had died in an accident at Monza earlier that autumn. In 1981, Reutemann instead relied on consistency, but narrowly lost out to Nelson Piquet for the title.

He became the second Formula One driver after Leo Kinnunen to be at the podium of a World Rally Championship event, when he finished third in the 1980 and 1985 editions of Rally Argentina. He was also for three decades the only Formula One driver to score drivers' championship points in both F1 and WRC, until Kimi Räikkönen's eighth place at the 2010 Jordan Rally.

As a popular governor and a senator, he was considered by some, on several occasions, to be a worthy candidate for President, but while he considered running for president in the 2011 Argentine general election he declined to do so.

Reutemann died in a medical facility in Santa Fe, Argentina on 7 July 2021 after suffering from issues relating to a haemorrhage as well as other health issues.

Racing career

Early years
Descended from a Swiss-German grandfather, an Argentine father and an Italian mother, Reutemann was the first successful Argentine Formula One driver to come along since the retirement of five-time World Champion Juan Manuel Fangio in 1958. He first raced in 1965 in a Fiat saloon car. After racing touring cars and Formula 2 in Argentina, he moved to Europe in 1970 to drive a Brabham for the Automobile Club of Argentina Team in the European Formula 2 series. He immediately received attention when he took out Austrian Formula One driver Jochen Rindt (that year's eventual posthumous World Champion) on the first lap of his first race at Hockenheim, but carried on to finish fourth. The next season, he finished a close second in the series to Sweden's Ronnie Peterson.

Formula One: early years

Brabham F1 team boss Bernie Ecclestone signed Reutemann to drive alongside veteran and two-time World Champion Graham Hill for the 1972 season. At the first race, in front of his home crowd at Buenos Aires for his first Grand Prix, Reutemann qualified his Brabham BT34 on pole position. This was a feat previously performed only by Mario Andretti, and since matched only by Jacques Villeneuve; his teammate Hill qualified 16th. He finished the race in seventh after having to pit to replace his soft tyres, and the main highlight for the rest of the year was his win in the non-championship Interlagos Grand Prix.

Teamed with Brazilian Wilson Fittipaldi Júnior for the 1973 season, Reutemann scored two podium finishes and seventh in the Drivers' Championship in the tiny but radical Gordon Murray-designed  BT42. For 1974, Murray designed the BT44, which was a further improvement and the team finished a close fifth in the Constructors' Championship. Reutemann, who very much liked the BT44 took the first three victories of his F1 career at South Africa, Austria, and the United States. He might have won the first race of the year in Argentina, too, but the Brabham team apparently failed to properly fuel his car and he ran out of fuel with less than two laps to go while safely in the lead. Though he matched Drivers' Champion Emerson Fittipaldi's win total, inconsistent performances in the other races left Reutemann sixth in the season standings.

Five podium finishes in 1975, including a win in Germany at the old 14-mile Nürburgring allowed Reutemann to place third in that year's championship. The Brabham team switched to the Alfa Romeo flat-12 engine for 1976 and suffered from serious reliability problems. After seven retirements and only one finish in the points (fourth place in Spain) in the first twelve races, Reutemann negotiated a release from his Brabham contract to sign with Ferrari, who was looking for a temporary replacement for the injured Niki Lauda. Lauda's unexpected speedy recovery resulted in Reutemann racing only once for the team, in a third car at Monza, and then sitting out for the final three races.

For the 1977 season Ferrari opted to keep the now fully recovered Lauda and have Reutemann replacing Clay Regazzoni, who moved on to the Ensign team. In the first two races, Reutemann finished third in Argentina and won in Brazil, outdriving Lauda in both events and taking the championship lead. For the Brazilian race, Ferrari had just designed a new rear wing that was put on Reutemann's car and not Lauda's, so Reutemann went into this Brazilian GP with a performance advantage and a psychological high- the psychological aspect being crucial to how Reutemann would perform in the race. Reutemann would later state in an interview that this was his best race. Over the course of the season, however, Lauda reaffirmed his position as team leader, and the Austrian won his second championship, while Reutemann finished fourth and did not win another race that year. Reutemann also did not have a good relationship with Ferrari chief engineer Mauro Forghieri, who was weary and distrustful of Reutemann and his temperament, even though Reutemann consistently finished races in the points and rarely ever retired (although difficult to drive, the Ferrari 312T2B was a very reliable car).

When Lauda moved to Brabham in 1978, Reutemann became the senior member of the Ferrari team, joined by the young Canadian Gilles Villeneuve. Reutemann used the 312T2B to win in Brazil, and a 312T3 to win in Britain and twice in the United States (Long Beach and Watkins Glen). Reutemann's win in Britain at Brands Hatch was particularly memorable as he took advantage of Lauda being held up by backmarker Bruno Giacomelli, and Reutemann passed a beleaguered Lauda for the lead at Clearways. However, the Lotus team was dominant once their new 79 was introduced at Monaco, and Reutemann finished a close third in the points standings behind Andretti and Peterson. Reutemann also had a huge accident at the Spanish Grand Prix after a tyre failure and a collision with Jacques Laffite sent his Ferrari into the air, clearing the Armco barrier and landing in the debris fencing.

With an opening at Lotus in 1979 after the death of Ronnie Peterson, Reutemann decided to move from Ferrari to Lotus. The first few races went well for him – highlights being forceful second places in Argentina and Spain, plus third places at Brazil and Monaco – but, as the season wore on, the team struggled while Jody Scheckter won the title for Ferrari. After four podiums and six points finishes in the first seven races, Reutemann ended up finishing in only seventh place for the season. Reutemann leaving Ferrari for Lotus for the 1979 season was poorly timed because with the introduction of the model 312T4, Ferrari was able to make a big comeback and place its drivers in 1st and 2nd place in the final standings of the season.

Career at Williams
Joining the Williams team for 1980 put him back in a competitive car once again- the very quick FW07. The season started off badly for the patriotic Argentinian- he failed to win his home Grand Prix in Buenos Aires (which was the first race of the season; this was a feat he would never accomplish) after his car suffered engine failure. Reutemann got out of the car, took off his helmet, sat down next to his car, and burst into tears in full view of cameras broadcasting the race worldwide and in front of the 80,000 spectators at the track. However, the season got much better as he would win at Monaco and score eight podiums throughout the year to finish third in the championship. His partnership with number one driver and World Champion Alan Jones was productive for Williams, who won their first Constructors' Championship with a then-record 120 points.

Reutemann's relationship with his teammate soured when, the following season, Reutemann disobeyed the team's orders and thereby refused to allow Jones to win in Brazil. Jones never forgave this act of disobedience on the part of his teammate, while Reutemann felt frustrated at Jones' refusal to acknowledge his help, especially after having just given him the victory at the Long Beach. Reutemann continued to score more points than Jones throughout the remainder of the season, and the Brazilian victory (and another in Belgium) helped put him in a position to challenge for the title in a three-way battle with Nelson Piquet and Jacques Laffite at the season-ending race in Las Vegas. In what was probably a defining moment of the season, Reutemann was ordered in Germany to turn over his unit to teammate Jones for the race due to the latter's car failure and had to race with the third unit of the team. That proved disastrous when his engine failed, preventing him from scoring points in a race where he had qualified in 3rd place.

Reutemann arrived in Las Vegas with a one-point lead in the championship over Brazilian Nelson Piquet. He began the race from pole position, ahead of Jones, who had vowed not to provide any "help" in Reutemann's quest, while Piquet was fourth. At the start, Jones jumped into the lead and Reutemann was quickly passed by Villeneuve, Alain Prost, and Bruno Giacomelli.

On lap 17, battling over seventh place as they approached the last left-hander before the pits, Piquet's Brabham was nearly touching the back of Reutemann's Williams. Piquet got around Reutemann on the inside when Reutemann, fighting for the championship, braked early. On the next lap, Andretti also went by Reutemann. Piquet put himself in a position to score points when he took over sixth place from John Watson on lap 22. Reutemann continued to slip backwards with gearbox trouble, having lost fourth gear as early as lap two. Reutemann finished the race in eighth, a lap down, and the title went to Piquet. Meanwhile, if that year's season opener, in South Africa, which had been run as a Formula Libre race and one which Ferrari, Alfa Romeo, Renault, and Ligier didn't attend, had been a race with World Championship points awarded, Reutemann would have been World Champion with 58 points against Piquet's 56. He returned with Williams for 1982, finishing  second in the South Africa, the only Cosworth-engined runner able to take the fight to the much more powerful turbo-engined Renaults. The Falklands War, however, generated a tense political period between Argentina and the United Kingdom, and Reutemann chose to distance himself from the team and retire after the Brazilian race. In light of the further developments that took place in Reutemann's life, many felt that his decision to terminate his racing career was made with an eye to his future in politics. This is disputed by Williams's Chief Designer Patrick Head, who felt that the Falklands War was only an excuse and that Reutemann had simply retired because "his heart wasn't in it anymore".

Formula One: legacy
In 2016, in an academic paper that reported a mathematical modeling study that assessed the relative influence of driver and machine, Reutemann was ranked the 27th best Formula One driver of all time.

Rallying career
Reutemann was approached by Fiat during the 1980 F1 season with an offer to drive a Fiat 131 in the inaugural 1980 Codasur Rally (now Rally Argentina), where he finished in third place. In 1985 he accepted another offer to drive in the Argentinian Rally, this time by Peugeot. Driving a 205 T16 Reutemann again finished in third place.

Political career

After retiring from racing, Reutemann's popularity led the Justicialist Party of the province of Santa Fe to invite him to run for governor. He won the election and ran the province for one four-year term (1991–1995). The provincial constitution does not allow for re-election, but after four years Reutemann presented again and won the governorship for the period 1999–2003. During those years, his profile grew and he became one of the leading politicians in Santa Fe and in Argentina.

Reutemann's second term was marked by the nationwide economic problems brought by the recession that had started in 1999 and ultimately led to the socioeconomic crash of 2001. Under Reutemann, Santa Fe kept a conservative fiscal policy, whereby it applied discounts and froze public workers' salaries and pensions through an Economic Emergency Law. The province was among the few not to resort to the issue of government bonds as a form of quasi-currency, and thus did not become highly indebted.

After the 2001 crash and the resignation of Fernando de la Rúa, Reutemann surprised and disappointed many by declining, on several occasions, to run for president. He finally presented himself for the 2003 general election and won a seat in the National Senate.

During the 2005 legislative elections Reutemann chose not to be a major participant in the campaign. After the Justicialist Party lost to the Socialist Party candidates for the first time in Santa Fe, members of the party were rumored to be unhappy about Reutemann's low profile. Reutemann also declined to run for governor of Santa Fe again in the 2007 elections.

On 1 January 2006 Reutemann was named Commendatore della Repubblica by President of the Italian Republic Carlo Azeglio Ciampi.

During a session in the Argentinian Senate on 17 July 2008, Reutemann presented an alternative project for the Commission of Agriculture in opposition to the one of then Vice-president Julio Cobos. His project didn't pass, and in February 2009 he renounced his role in the Bloque Parliamentario del Frente para la Victoria to create his own political fraction, "Santa Fe Federal", with the intention of protecting the interests of the province.

He was re-elected to the Senate both in 2009 and 2015, when he formed part of the Cambiemos alliance nationally and supported Mauricio Macri in the presidential election. He died in office, so María Alejandra Vucasovich replaced him for the remainder of his term.

Death
Reutemann suffered an intestinal haemorrhage in May 2021, and was hospitalized. His condition worsened, and he suffered from anaemia, dehydration, hypoalbuminemia, haemodynamic instability, very rapid weight loss. He died on 7 July, at 79 years old, and the news was announced by his daughter on social media.

Many Argentine politicians gave their condolences through their Twitter accounts, such as the presidents Mauricio Macri, Alberto Fernández, and Cristina Fernández de Kirchner, and many from both major parties, Juntos por el Cambio and Frente de Todos.

Racing record

Career summary

Complete Formula One World Championship results
(key) (Races in bold indicate pole position, races in italics indicate fastest lap)

Notes
 –  Half points were awarded because the races were stopped before 75% of the scheduled distance was completed.

Non-championship Formula One results
(key) (Races in bold indicate pole position, races in italics indicate fastest lap)
(Races in italics indicate fastest lap)

Complete 24 Hours of Le Mans results

Complete WRC results

Notes

External links 

1942 births
2021 deaths
Argentine racing drivers
Argentine Formula One drivers
Brabham Formula One drivers
Ferrari Formula One drivers
Team Lotus Formula One drivers
Williams Formula One drivers
Formula One race winners
European Formula Two Championship drivers
Turismo Carretera drivers
24 Hours of Le Mans drivers
Argentine sportsperson-politicians
Members of the Argentine Senate for Santa Fe
Governors of Santa Fe Province
People from Santa Fe, Argentina
Argentine people of Swiss-German descent
Argentine people of Italian descent
Justicialist Party politicians
Argentine rally drivers
World Sportscar Championship drivers
Peugeot Sport drivers
BMW M drivers
World Rally Championship drivers